Saba Anglana (born November 17, 1970) is a Somali-Italian actress and international singer.

Biography
Saba was born in Mogadishu, the capital of Somalia, during the country's socialist period. Her mother was the daughter of an exiled Somali living in neighboring Ethiopia. Her father was a former commander in the Italian military, who relocated to Somalia from Italy after the Second World War.

Due to Saba's father's senior martial background with the erstwhile colonial administration, he was regarded by Somalia's then military regime as a possible spy. The Anglanas were subsequently exiled to Italy, when she was still a child.

Saba was thereafter raised in Italy, where she later studied at the Sapienza University in Rome. Her Somali roots, however, remained an important focus. She studied the Somali language with her mother, particularly the regional dialect of Xamar Weyne, connecting with Somalia through music. Saba is a Muslim.

Career
Saba began her artistic career in the 1990s as an actress on Italian television. In a popular local TV series entitled La Squadra, she played a policewoman of dual Somali-Italian heritage.

In 2007, Saba released her first studio album entitled Jidka: The Line, in which she mixes the traditional sounds of her native Somalia with contemporary Italian flourishes.

See also
Elisa Kadigia Bove
Jonis Bashir

References

External links
The official Website of Saba Anglana
Article on Saba Anglana

Living people
1970 births
21st-century Somalian women singers
Somalian emigrants to Italy
People from Mogadishu
Sapienza University of Rome alumni
Somalian people of Italian descent
21st-century Italian women singers